John Fortenberry is an American film and television director.

Born in Jackson, Mississippi, he graduated from the University of Mississippi, after which he went to work at Lorne Michaels' Broadway Video, serving as editor for eight years before becoming a film and television producer.

He directed the films A Night at the Roxbury, Underfunded and Jury Duty, and such television shows as Sonny with a Chance, It's Always Sunny in Philadelphia, Everybody Loves Raymond, The King of Queens, Blue Mountain State, Rescue Me, Memphis Beat, and Galavant.

In 2020, Fortenberry appeared as a guest on the Studio 60 on the Sunset Strip marathon fundraiser episode of The George Lucas Talk Show.

References

External links

American television directors
Living people
Artists from Jackson, Mississippi
Year of birth missing (living people)
University of Mississippi alumni
American film editors
American television producers
Film directors from Mississippi